Mount Hillers is a summit in the Henry Mountains range, in Garfield County, Utah, in the United States.

It was named by Almon Harris Thompson for John Karl Hillers, a government photographer.

Climate
Spring and fall are the most favorable seasons to visit Mount Hillers. According to the Köppen climate classification system, it is located in a Cold semi-arid climate zone, which is defined by the coldest month having an average mean temperature below 32 °F (0 °C), and at least 50% of the total annual precipitation being received during the spring and summer.

See also

 Colorado Plateau
 Laccolith
 List of mountain peaks of Utah

References

External links
 Weather forecast: Mount Hillers

Mountains of Garfield County, Utah
Mountains of Utah